Redis (Remote Dictionary Server) is an open-source in-memory data structure project.

Redis may also refer to:

Abou Redis, a city in South Sinai Governorate, Egypt
Redis (company), an American computer software company
Denys Prokopenko, Ukrainian military commander

See also
Redi (disambiguation)